The Hotel Senator is a landmark building located in downtown Saskatoon, Saskatchewan, Canada.  The building was built as the Flanagan Hotel by James Flanagan, an early settler in Saskatoon, and designed by Walter William LaChance, an architect who designed many local Saskatoon buildings at the turn of the century. When originally built, the hotel included many luxury features for 1907, including steam heating, hot and cold running water, telephones in each room and extensive use of marble and wood paneling. James Flanagan died in 1909; the hotel was subsequently sold in 1910 for $150,000 by his estate.

Today the property is designated a protected building. It houses a European-style boutique hotel with 38 rooms.

References

External links
 

Buildings and structures in Saskatoon
Hotel buildings completed in 1907
Hotels in Saskatchewan